The Puig des Molins (literally "Windmills' Hill") is in Ibiza Town (Island of Ibiza, Balearic Islands, Spain), containing the Punic Necropolis of Puig des Molins, a medieval Islamic rural property, and an archaeological museum.

See also 
 Images of Puig des Molins on the Wikimedia Commons 

Buildings and structures in Ibiza
Phoenician funerary practices